Samcheok Station is a railway station on the Samcheok Line in South Korea.

References

External links
Samcheok Station information  from Samcheok City

Railway stations in Gangwon Province, South Korea
Samcheok
Railway stations opened in 1944